Geert Leus from the Delft University of Technology, Delft, Netherlands was named Fellow of the Institute of Electrical and Electronics Engineers (IEEE) in 2012 for contributions to signal processing for communications.

References

Fellow Members of the IEEE
Living people
Year of birth missing (living people)
Place of birth missing (living people)
Academic staff of the Delft University of Technology